The Fourth cabinet of Hermann Jónasson was formed 18 November 1941.

Cabinets

Inaugural cabinet

Change (17 January 1942)

See also 

1941 establishments in Iceland
1942 disestablishments in Iceland
Hermann Jonasson, Fourth cabinet of
Cabinets established in 1941
Cabinets disestablished in 1942
Independence Party (Iceland)
Progressive Party (Iceland)